{{Album ratings
|MC=74/100
|rev1=AllMusic
|rev1Score=
|rev2=Exclaim!
|rev2Score=9/10
|rev3=Kerrang!
|rev3Score=
|rev4=Music Connection
|rev4Score=8/10
|rev5=Revolver
|rev5Score=4/5<ref>Bayer, Jonah (June 2, 2016). "Saosin, 'Along The Shadow'". 'Revolver. NewBay Media. Retrieved July 8, 2016.</ref>
|rev6=Rock Sound|rev6Score=7/10
|rev7=Rolling Stone Australia|rev7Score = 
}}Along the Shadow'' is the third studio album by American rock band Saosin, released on May 20, 2016 through Epitaph Records. The album marks the end of a three-and-a-half-year hiatus for the group with the return of original lead vocalist Anthony Green. It also marks the subsequent departure of lead guitarist Justin Shekoski.

Track listing

Personnel
Saosin
 Anthony Green - lead vocals 
 Beau Burchell - guitar, backing vocals
 Chris Sorenson - bass guitar, keyboards, backing vocals
 Alex Rodriguez - drums, percussion

Production
 Chris Sorenson - producer
 Beau Burchell - engineer, producer
 Will Yip - writer, engineer, vocal production

Charts

References 

Saosin albums
2016 albums
Albums produced by Will Yip
Epitaph Records albums